"The Center of My Universe" is a song co-written and recorded by American country music duo The Bellamy Brothers.  It was released in November 1989 as the third single from their Greatest Hits Volume III compilation album.  The song reached #37 on the Billboard Hot Country Singles & Tracks chart.  The song was written by David Bellamy, Howard Bellamy and Don Schlitz.

Chart performance

References

1989 singles
1989 songs
The Bellamy Brothers songs
Songs written by David Bellamy (singer)
Songs written by Howard Bellamy
Songs written by Don Schlitz
Song recordings produced by Tony Brown (record producer)
MCA Records singles
Curb Records singles